Wandi is a suburb of Perth, Western Australia in the City of Kwinana at its northern border. The suburb was approved on 14 March 1978.

The suburb is zoned Special Rural, which prevents the loss of trees from clearing. The area is mainly divided into  lots. The land of Wandi is bushland, and some of it is part of the Jandakot Regional Park.

The Western boundary is the Kwinana Freeway.  Market gardens in the western area bounded by the freeway and Lyon Road are being developed into a residential area name Honeywood.

Wandi was named after a highly regarded Aboriginal stockman, who drove northwest cattle from Robb Jetty to nearby holding paddocks as well as driving sheep into paddocks around Cockburn Sound. For the first four decades of the twentieth century Wandi worked for Anchorage Butchers, owned by Copley, Atkinson and Negus. For at least some of this time, Wandi lived in the racing quarters of George Atkinson's South Fremantle home, working the many racehorses he owned. Wandi died in 1955 at the age of 76.

A rare, and possibly the last, chuditch or western quoll (Dasyurus geoffroii ), an endangered carnivorous marsupial not seen in the Perth area for nearly twenty years, was caught by a rabbit trap in Wandi in March 2009.

In the early 2010s, an estate called Honeywood came to the town. It grew pretty fast from 782 in the 2006 census to 2,854 people at the 2016 census. Honeywood Primary School was the first school to open in Wandi and was opened officially in 2018. As of 2021, Honeywood Primary School is the only school in Wandi.

References

External links

Suburbs of Perth, Western Australia
Suburbs in the City of Kwinana